Congregation Schara Tzedeck is an Orthodox synagogue in Vancouver, British Columbia, Canada. A place of worship in Greater Vancouver, it is the oldest synagogue and the largest Orthodox synagogue in the city. Its name is Hebrew for "Gates of Righteousness".

Founded in 1907, it was originally known as "Benei Yehuda" and was located at East Pender Street at Heatley Street in the Strathcona neighbourhood, then the focus of the city's Jewish community. Francis George Gardiner, architect's drawings of the Schara Tzedeck synagogue, circa 1920 are at Vancouver City Archives.

Its present rabbi is Rabbi Andrew Rosenblatt. Congregation Schara Tzedeck celebrated its centennial in 2007. The congregation has a diverse membership, with many multi-generational families and long-time members. It is located at 3476 Oak Street, Vancouver, BC. Notable members included David Oppenheimer, entrepreneur and second Mayor of Vancouver, who donated the land for the original site.

The synagogue holds daily prayer services, and has numerous educational and social programs for children and youth, men, women, families, and seniors. Examples include weekly adult education classes, youth events, Bar/Bat Mitzvah classes, guest lectures, Shabbat dinners, and holiday programming. A mikveh is located on-site. The Vancouver chapter of NCSY operates out of the synagogue. Congregation Schara Tzedeck is affiliated with the Union of Orthodox Jewish Congregations of America.

History

The congregation was founded in 1907 as "Benei Yehuda", which can be translated as Children (Sons) of Judah. The first synagogue building was erected at Pender Street and Heatley Avenue in 1911. The congregation was legally incorporated on June 14, 1917 under a newly chosen name, "Schara Tzedeck", which means Gates of Righteousness. A new larger building was completed in September 1947, located in the South Cambie neighbourhood adjacent to the Shaughnessy neighborhood. The new synagogue was officially opened on January 25, 1948. In 1963, an expansion was constructed on property to the immediate north to accommodate offices, classrooms, a large auditorium, and other facilities. Past rabbis include Rabbi Bernard Goldenberg, Rabbi Marvin Heir, Rabbi Mordechai Feuerstein, and Rabbi Avi Baumol. The Institute for Stained Glass in Canada has documented the stained glass at Schara Tzedeck Synagogue.

Present

The synagogue has seen growth in membership over the last several years. Its youth program, including NCSY chapter, was reinvigorated in 2001 due to the efforts of Rabbi Avi Berman and has continued to see strong attendance and growth. In 2007, to commemorate the synagogue's centennial, a Century Campaign raised funds for a youth programming fund and renovations of the lower level. The campaign culminated in the Century Celebration gala event held in the spring of 2007. The renovation was completed in the fall of 2011. The new facilities include modern state-of-the-art kitchens, a completely renovated social hall dedicated as the Silber Auditorium, an expansion of the Wosk Auditorium, and renovation of the Beit Midrash. The Beit Midrash was rededicated as the Jack and Sadie Diamond Z"L Beit Midrash and the Yosef Wosk Library.

See also

 Oldest synagogues in Canada
 History of the Jews in Canada
 Jews and Judaism in Vancouver

Further reading
 D. Wertheimer,"Attendance at Orthodox Minyanim: Vancouver and San Diego in the 1970s," Western States Jewish History vol. 51 (Spring 2021), 61-80 (ISSN 0749-5471)

References

External links
 Schara Tzedeck's website

Ashkenazi Jewish culture in Canada
Ashkenazi synagogues
Jews and Judaism in Vancouver
Synagogues in British Columbia
Religious buildings and structures in Vancouver
Jewish organizations established in 1907
1907 establishments in British Columbia